Slotnick is a surname. Notable people with the surname include:

 Barry Slotnick (born 1939), attorney
 Daniel Slotnick (1931–1985), mathematician and computer architect
 Joey Slotnick (born 1968), American actor
 Stuart Slotnick (born 1969), American attorney
 Michael Slotnick (born 1982), teacher